Brian J. Alters, Ph.D. is a professor in Chapman University's College of Educational Studies. He directs Chapman's Evolution Education Research Center, has taught science education at both Harvard and McGill Universities, and is regarded as a specialist in evolution education.

Biography 

Alters has a B.Sc. in biology and a Ph.D. in science education from the University of Southern California.

Alters is the author of several books on biology and the intelligent design controversy.  With his wife Sandra M. Alters, he has written Biology: Understanding Life which he describes as "a university biology non-majors textbook", and Teaching Biology in Higher Education, "a book written to instructors at the college level on how to teach biology".  He is also the author of Teaching Biological Evolution in Higher Education: Methodological, Religious, and Non-Religious Issues which he says is "a book specifically about the conflict that instructors see students bring into their courses concerning evolution".  Alters and Alters have also written Defending Evolution in the Classroom, with a foreword by Stephen Jay Gould, which aims to help science teachers to understand the creation–evolution controversy and to teach evolution effectively in light of the controversy.  He also contributed a chapter to the a chapter in Not in Our Classrooms: Why Intelligent Design is Wrong for Our Schools, edited by Eugenie Scott and Glenn Branch of the NCSE.

Because of this specialization, he was an expert witness for the plaintiffs in the 2005 case Kitzmiller v. Dover Area School District.  He was also brought in for the retrial of Selman v. Cobb County before that was settled out of court in favor of the plaintiffs.

In 2003, Alters was first awarded the McGill Faculty of Education's highest teaching award, the Distinguished Teaching Award, followed by the University-wide Principal's Prize for Excellence in Teaching.

In 2005, he was appointed to the board of directors of the American-based National Center for Science Education and received its "friend of Darwin" award.

In 2008, Alters became a co-host of CBC Television's nationally broadcast prime-time science series Project X. His co-hosts were Dr. Jennifer Gardy (bioinformatics/microbiology at the University of British Columbia), Dr. Brian Fleck (professor of mechanical engineering at the University of Alberta), and Marc Huot (mechanical engineering student at the University of Alberta).

Grant controversy 
In 2005 Alters was denied funding for a research project provisionally titled "Detrimental effects of popularizing anti-evolution's intelligent design theory on Canadian students, teachers, parents, administrators and policymakers." by the Social Sciences and Humanities Research Council of Canada (SSHRC).  The SSHRC's reason for the rejection included the statement, "Nor did the committee consider that there was adequate justification for the assumption in the proposal that the theory of Evolution, and not Intelligent Design theory, was correct".  This was reported in Nature and other media.

Letters were written to the SSHRC in support of Alters by the American Institute of Biological Sciences, the American Sociological Association, the Canadian Society for Ecology and Evolution, and others.  The SSHRC replied by noting that "theory of evolution is not in doubt" but said that the reason for the rejection was that "the committee had serious concerns about the proposed research design".

Bibliography

References

External links 
 Evolution Education Research Centre (EERC)
 Brian Alters discusses evolution and education at NIH, June 22, 2006
 "Ties" to Canada by Brian Alters

1950 births
Canadian educational theorists
Critics of creationism
USC Rossier School of Education alumni
Harvard University faculty
Living people
McGill University alumni